Richard Wright Nowels Jr. is an American songwriter, record producer, multi-instrumentalist and arranger. He has co-written and co-produced over 90 hit singles with multiple artists and albums his songs have appeared on have sold over 250 million copies. In 2020, he was inducted into the Songwriters Hall of Fame.

Career
In 1985, Stevie Nicks recorded Nowels’ song “I Can't Wait” in Los Angeles, giving Rick his first major songwriting and production credit. He was later asked to co-produce Nicks’ album Rock a Little alongside Jimmy Iovine. The album was released in 1986 and featured 5 songs produced by Nowels. “I Can't Wait” peaked at number 16 for two weeks on the Billboard Hot 100 chart and is one of only four of Nicks' singles to enter the Dance Club Songs chart.

In 1987, Nowels produced Belinda Carlisle's album Heaven on Earth. The album also featured four songs written by Nowels, including “Heaven Is a Place on Earth” and "Circle in the Sand" which went to number one and number seven respectively, on the Billboard Hot 100 chart. In 1989 Nowels produced also the third Belinda Carlisle's album "Runaway Horses". Nowels wrote 6 of the 10 songs, including "Leave a light on" wich went to number eleven on the Billboard Hot 100 chart and to number 4 in the UK.

Nowels co-wrote the title track for Celine Dion's album Falling into You, which won the Grammy Award for Album of the Year in 1997.

Nowels co-wrote and co-produced the hit single "The Game of Love", performed by Santana and Michelle Branch, which won ASCAP Song of the Year in 2003. He also co-wrote the global hit single "White Flag" for Dido, which won the 2004 Ivor Novello Award for International Hit of the Year.

In 2013 Nowels collaborated with Adele on the song "Why Do You Love Me?", released as part of the deluxe version of her album 25. Nowels co-wrote and co-produced the hit single "Out of Love" with Alessia Cara from her sophomore album, The Pains of Growing. In collaboration with R&B singer-songwriter Miguel, Nowels co-wrote the hit single "Lost in Your Light" for Dua Lipa's self-titled debut album. Nowels has been a longtime collaborator of Swedish singer-songwriter Lykke Li. He has co-written songs on 3 of her albums: Wounded Rhymes, I Never Learn, and So Sad So Sexy, including the international hit single, "I Follow Rivers". Nowels co-wrote the hit single "Loud Places" from In Colour, the solo debut album of Jamie XX.

In 2016, Nowels co-wrote and co-produced the British artist FKA Twigs' single, "Good to Love". 
The same year, Nowels co-wrote five songs for Tom Odell's third album Wrong Crowd, along with the hit single, "Magnetized". In 2021, Tom Odell released "Monster", the title track for his fourth album, which was co-written with Nowels.

Madonna
While Nowels was in New York for the Grammy Awards in 1997, he met Madonna during a shopping expedition at Barneys. She later booked two weeks’ worth of writing time with Rick in his Hollywood Hills studio. Together they wrote “The Power of Good-Bye,” “Little Star,” and “To Have and Not to Hold”, all featured on Madonna's seventh studio album, Ray of Light.

Ray of Light won Best Pop Album at the 1998 Grammy Awards, where Madonna thanked Nowels from the stage during her acceptance speech. The album also won Best Recording Package, Best Dance Recording, and Best Short Form Music Video.

In 2014, Nowels and Madonna collaborated again on a song, “Beautiful Scars,” for her thirteenth studio album, Rebel Heart.

Dido
Nowels met Dido in 1999 where she was making her debut album No Angel under Cheeky Records, an independent label in London. Rick co-produced three songs on her first album including "Here With Me", "Hunter", and "All You Want", all which were released as singles to promote the album. "Here With Me" became Dido's debut single as an artist, peaking at number four in the UK Singles Chart. The album No Angel went on to sell 15 million copies worldwide and made Dido an international superstar.

In 2002, Rick and Dido collaborated again to produce her second album Life For Rent. Nowels wrote five songs featured on the album, including singles "White Flag" and "Sand in My Shoes". The album became the seventh best-selling album of the 2000s in the UK, was nominated for a Grammy, won the award for "Best Single" at the 2004 Brit Awards, won "International Hit of the Year" at the 2004 Ivor Novello Awards, and other accolades.

The pair went on to collaborate on Dido's Safe Trip Home album in 2008, her Girl Who Got Away album in 2013, and her 2019 album Still on My Mind.

Lana Del Rey
Nowels met Lana Del Rey in the spring of 2011 and has collaborated with her on multiple albums since.

In a three-day writing session they composed, “Summertime Sadness,” “Dark Paradise,” “Lucky Ones,” and “TV in Black & White.” The first three songs were released on Del Rey's 2012 Born To Die album, peaking at number one in the UK in 2012. The album sold 77,000 copies in the US within the first week and peaked at number two on the Billboard Top 200, just behind Adele’s album, 21. It received gold certification in 2013 and became the fifth best-selling album of 2012, selling 3.4 million copies.

In November 2012, Del Rey released, The Paradise Edition, of the Born To Die album with three songs written and produced by Nowels and Del Rey. “Body Electric", “American,” and “Cola”.

In 2013, Nowels and Del Rey's song, “Young and Beautiful,” was featured in Baz Luhrmann’s film, The Great Gatsby. The song was featured throughout the film and incorporated into the score by Craig Armstrong. “Young and Beautiful,” was released in April 2013. By June 2013 it rose to number three on the charts and has sold over a million copies since its release.

In 2015, Del Rey released her fourth studio album, Honeymoon. The entire album was co-written by Del Rey and Nowels with the exception of the cover, “Don't Let Me Be Misunderstood.” Del Rey and Nowels’ singles include, “High by the Beach,” as well as, “Music To Watch Boys To.” Honeymoon, debuted at number two on the US Billboard 200 and reached number one in Australia, Greece, Ireland, and number two in the UK.

In 2017, Del Rey released her fifth studio album, Lust For Life. Del Rey and Nowels co-wrote 14 of the songs for the album including the 3 singles, “Love,” “Lust for Life,” ft. the Weeknd and “White Mustang.” The album was nominated for a Grammy Award for Best Pop Vocal Album. It debuted at number one on the US Billboard 200, as well as the UK Albums Chart.

Dua Lipa
Nowels co wrote Lost in Your Light with Miguel and Dua Lipa which was the 6th single on the singer's debut titled Dua Lipa released 2 June 2017. Dua Lipa won an award for Best New Artist at the 61st Annual Grammy Awards and as of 2020, the album has sold over 4 million copies worldwide.

Discography

Notable works

 "Out of Love" by Alessia Cara
 "Hunt You Down" by Kesha
 "Lost in Your Light" by Dua Lipa
 "To Be Human" by Sia
 "Wrong Crowd" by Tom Odell
 "Magnetized" by Tom Odell
 "Loud Places" by Jamie xx
 "Silver Line" by Lykke Li
 "In God's Hands" by Nelly Furtado
 "Bubblegum Bitch" by Marina and the Diamonds
 "The World as I See It" by Jason Mraz
 "I Follow Rivers" by Lykke Li
 "Cry Baby" by CeeLo Green
 "Fallin' for You" by Colbie Caillat
 "Green Light" by John Legend
 "White Flag" by Dido
 "Sand in My Shoes" by Dido
 "Everybody Finds Out" by Fleetwood Mac
 "The Game of Love" by Santana
 "Here with Me" by Dido
 "Hunter" by Dido
 "Northern Star" by Melanie C
 "The Power of Good-Bye" by Madonna
 "To Have and Not to Hold" by Madonna
 "Little Star" by Madonna
 "You Get What You Give" by New Radicals
 "Thinking of You (I Drive Myself Crazy)" by NSYNC"
 "Falling into You" by Celine Dion
 "Body and Soul" by Anita Baker
 "Live Your Life Be Free" by Belinda Carlisle
 "Do You Feel Like I Feel?" by Belinda Carlisle
 "Leave a Light On" by Belinda Carlisle
 "La Luna" by Belinda Carlisle
 "Rooms on Fire" by Stevie Nicks
 "Long Way to Go" by Stevie Nicks
 "Heaven Is a Place on Earth" by Belinda Carlisle
 "I Can't Wait" by Stevie Nicks
"Take You Home" by Dido

Personal life
Nowels married singer-songwriter, Maria Vidal, in 1990. Vidal attended New York University and is known for writing the hit dance song, "Body Rock", charting on the Billboard Hot 100 chart. The couple have a son, Tommy, born in 1993. Nowels is a supporter of TreePeople Los Angeles, The Sierra Club, and the Natural Resource Defense Council (NRDC).

Awards and nominations

|-
| 2014
| Young and Beautiful by Lana Del Rey
| Satellite Award for Best Original Song
| 
| Co-writer
|-
| 2004
| White Flag
| Ivor Novello Award for International Hit of the Year
| 
| Co-writer

ASCAP Pop Music Awards 

|-
| 2014
| The Game of Love by Santana ft. Michelle Branch
| Song of the Year
| 
| Co-writer

Grammy Awards

!Ref.
|-
|2013
|"Young And Beautiful"
|Best Song Written for Visual Media
|
|rowspan="4" style="text-align:center;" |
|-
|2003
|"Love One Another"
|Best Dance Recording
|
|-
|1997
|Falling into You
|Album of the Year
|
|-
|1994
|"Body and Soul"
|Best R&B Song
|
|-

References

External links
Rick Nowels' official website

Living people
Record producers from California
Songwriters from California
American record producers
Writers from Palo Alto, California
Ivor Novello Award winners
Grammy Award winners
1960 births